Arraial d'Ajuda is a district in the municipality of Porto Seguro, Bahia, Brazil.

References 

Populated places in Bahia